Bernhard Stomporowski (born 19 May 1966) is a retired German lightweight rower. He is a triple world champion.

Stomporowski was born in 1966 in Braunschweig, West Germany. He started rowing in 1982. He first competed internationally at the 1987 World Rowing Championships in Copenhagen, Denmark, where he won a silver medal with the lightweight eight. He was world champion with the lightweight four in 1989 and 1990. He competed in the lightweight men's four at the 1996 Summer Olympics in the United States where his team came fifth.

He studied rowing at the Trainerakademie in Cologne. On 20 December 1999, he married fellow international rower Katrin Rutschow. They lived in Switzerland until 2007, where they worked as rowing trainers. They divorced in 2010. In 2011, he was head coach of the California Rowing Club (CRC), and Kathleen Bertko and Kristin Hedstrom from his club won silver at the 2013 World Rowing Championships. While coaching for CRC, he lived in Alameda, California.

References 

1966 births
Living people
Sportspeople from Braunschweig
German male rowers
Olympic rowers of Germany
Rowers at the 1996 Summer Olympics
World Rowing Championships medalists for West Germany
World Rowing Championships medalists for Germany